James Henry Randolph (October 18, 1825 – August 22, 1900) was an American politician and a member of the United States House of Representatives for the 1st congressional district of Tennessee.

Biography
Born near Dandridge, Tennessee in Jefferson County on October 18, 1825, Randolph was the son of James Montgomery and Nancy Goan Randolph. He attended New Market Academy and graduated from Holston College in New Market, Tennessee. He studied law, was admitted to the bar in 1850, and commenced practice in Dandridge, Tennessee.  He married Melinda Jane Robinson and they had three children, William H., Ralph Montgomery, and Townzella.

Career
Randolph was a member of the Tennessee House of Representatives in 1857, 1858, 1859, 1860, and 1861. He served in the Tennessee Senate in 1865. He was elected judge of the second judicial circuit of Tennessee in 1869. He was re-elected after the Tennessee state constitutional convention in 1870.

Elected as a Republican to the Forty-fifth Congress, Randolph served from March 4, 1877 to March 3, 1879.  He engaged in agricultural pursuits and milling.

Death
Randolph died on August 22, 1900 (age 74 years, 308 days) in Newport, Tennessee in Cocke County. He is interred at Union Cemetery.

References

External links 

 
 

1825 births
1900 deaths
People from Jefferson County, Tennessee
Republican Party members of the Tennessee House of Representatives
Republican Party Tennessee state senators
Republican Party members of the United States House of Representatives from Tennessee
Southern Unionists in the American Civil War
19th-century American politicians
People from Newport, Tennessee